Mayra Kroonen (born 6 June 1988) is a former artistic gymnast. She competed at the 2009 World Artistic Gymnastics Championships.

References

1988 births
Living people
Dutch female artistic gymnasts
Place of birth missing (living people)
21st-century Dutch women